Ann Tse-kai   ( also known as T.K. Ann; 26 June 1912 – 3 June 2000) was a Hong Kong industrialist, legislator and sinologist. He was the author of Cracking the Chinese Puzzles, a textbook on Chinese characters.

Ann lived in Hong Kong and was a prominent member of the Hong Kong General Chamber of Commerce. He represented the Winsor Industrial Group and, from 1970 to 1978, represented the Chamber of Commerce in the Hong Kong Legislative Council (LegCo).

In 1973, Ann chaired a LegCo commission of enquiry into a teachers' strike.

Cracking the Chinese Puzzles 
Cracking the Chinese Puzzles is a textbook for learning Chinese characters. It was originally published as a five volume set, but was later (1987) printed as an abridged version in one volume.

References

External links 

1912 births
2000 deaths
Chinese sinologists
Hong Kong businesspeople
Businesspeople from Shanghai
Members of the Legislative Council of Hong Kong
Members of the Executive Council of Hong Kong
Members of the Preparatory Committee for the Hong Kong Special Administrative Region
Recipients of the Grand Bauhinia Medal
Officers of the Order of the British Empire
Hong Kong Basic Law Consultative Committee members
Hong Kong Basic Law Drafting Committee members
Hong Kong Affairs Advisors
20th-century Chinese historians
People from Shanghai
Vice Chairpersons of the National Committee of the Chinese People's Political Consultative Conference
Chinese emigrants to British Hong Kong